The Miss Texas' Outstanding Teen competition is the pageant that selects the representative for the U.S. state of Texas in the Miss America's Outstanding Teen pageant. The pageant is held each July at the Charles W. Eisemann Center for Performing Arts in Richardson, Texas.

J-Belle Kimbrell of Dallas was crowned Miss Texas' Outstanding Teen on June 25, 2022 at the Renaissance in Richardson, Texas. She competed for the title of Miss America's Outstanding Teen 2023 at the Hyatt Regency Dallas in Dallas, Texas on August 12, 2022 where she was 2nd runner-up and won the Advertisement Sales award.

Results summary
The results of Miss Texas' Outstanding Teen as they participated in the national Miss America's Outstanding Teen competition. The year in parentheses indicates the year of the Miss America's Outstanding Teen competition the award/placement was garnered.

Placements
 Miss America's Outstanding Teen: Meghan Miller (2006), London Hibbs (2019)
 1st runners-up: Addyson Jackson (2016)
2nd runners-up: Katherine Omo-Osagie (2022), J-Belle Kimbrell (2023)
 3rd runners-up: Reilly Johannson (2012), Stephanie Wendt (2018)
 Top 7: Kassidy Brown (2015), Heather King (2017)
 Top 8: Margana Wood (2013)
 Top 10: Sydney Capello (2009)
 Top 12: Sheridan Donevant (2014)

Awards

Preliminary awards
 Preliminary Evening Wear/On Stage Question: Meghan Miller (2006), Kendall Morris (2007), Sydney Capello (2009), Stephanie Wendt (2018), London Hibbs (2019), Katherine Omo-Osagie (2022)
 Preliminary Lifestyle & Fitness: Kendall Morris (2007)
 Preliminary Talent: Meghan Miller (2006), Sydney Capello (2009), London Hibbs (2019)

Non-finalist awards 
 Non-finalist Talent: Allie Graves (2020)

Other awards
 Advertisement Sales Award: J-Belle Kimbrell (2023)
 America's Choice: Sheridan Donevant (2014)
 Overall Talent: Meghan Miller (2006)
 Overall Vocal Talent: Allie Graves (2020)
 Scholastic Excellence: Stephanie Wendt (2018)
 Spirit of America Award: Heather King (2017)
 Top Advertisement Sales Media Scholarship: Allie Graves (2020)
Top Interview Award: Katherine Omo-Osagie (2022) (tie)

Winners

References

External links
 Official website

Texas
Texas culture
Women in Texas
Annual events in Texas